The War That Saved My Life, by Kimberly Brubaker Bradley, is a 2015 children’s historical novel published by Dial Books for Young Readers. In 2016, it was a Newbery Honor Book and was named to the Bank Street Children's Book Committee's Best Books of the Year List with an "Outstanding Merit" distinction and won the Committee's Josette Frank Award for fiction.

Plot 
Ada Smith is a ten-year-old girl who has never left her apartment in London. Her physically abusive, widowed mother is too embarrassed to let her go outside because of her clubfoot, even though she claims Ada is mentally disabled instead. As a regular punishment, Ada gets put in a damp cabinet under the sink where cockroaches live. She is used as a servant, cooks and takes care of her six-year-old brother Jamie and her mother. She is also quite protective of him. 

In September 1939, the British government begins to evacuate children in urban areas of England during World War II to escape, sending them to the countryside. Ada’s mother refuses to send Ada saying nobody will want to take care of her. Meanwhile, Ada has spent all summer teaching herself how to walk and decides to leave with Jamie without their mother knowing. They are evacuated by train to Kent to finally get away from the arising conditions yet to come because of the war.

Susan Smith, an unrelated woman who lives in a coastal village in Kent, is forced to take Ada and Jamie in, despite her aversion to caring for children. Away from her mother, Ada is allowed to freely move about by Susan despite her clubfoot, and as such befriends Susan and other villagers. She learns to read, write, ride a horse, and is introduced by Susan to many terms and concepts she has never experienced before. Susan overcomes her reluctance to take care of the children, reading to them, making them clothes, obtaining crutches for Ada, and allowing Jamie to keep a cat she intensely dislikes. Ada helps British troops evacuate across the English Channel from Dunkirk, and identifies an enemy spy, who is then detained.

Susan has discovered that it is possible for an operation to be conducted on Ada to correct her clubfoot, but it requires money and permission from Ada's mother. After months of not responding to Susan's letters regarding Ada's operation, Ada's mother comes to the village. She complains about the government's 'forcing' her to spend money on her children, and sharply criticizes Susan and Ada's 'posh' behavior. Ada is able to stay with Susan, but to continue caring for her brother she decides to move back to London with her mother, who believes that the capital will not be bombed anytime soon. The Smiths move into a new - albeit little better - flat, and Ada's crutches are taken away by her mother. She believes her mother never wanted to have children in the first place and only took Ada and Jamie back for the lowered expenses, suspicions confirmed by their mother. One day, she leaves to go to work and Ada and Jamie escape to an air raid shelter just before a bomb damages the area. Susan comes and finds the Smith children, bringing them back to the village, only to find that a bomb has destroyed her house. Ada's horse and Jamie's cat have survived; Ada decides that by being picked up in London by Susan rather than the latter staying at home and getting killed sufficiently repays her debt to Susan for being rescued from life with her mother.

Characters
 Ada Smith: A ten-year-old girl whose right foot is affected by clubfoot. She has been emotionally and physically abused by her mother. While living in the countryside with Susan, Ada learns how to walk, ride a horse, read, and write.
 Jamie Smith: Ada's six-year-old brother. He discovers his passion for planes when he and Ada move to the countryside.
 Susan Smith: Ada's designated guardian, learns to love and take care of both Ada and Jamie after some reluctance.
 Mam: Ada and Jamie's mother. An uncaring, stern, aggressive, and abusive mother who continuously blames Ada for her "ugly foot".
 Mrs. Thorton: Also known as the Iron-faced Lady. In charge of the evacuations to Kent.
 Margaret (Maggie) Thorton: The Iron-faced Lady's 12-year-old daughter. Ada's friend. Sassy, but nice.
 Fred Grimes: The person who looks after the horses at the Thorton's stable.

Reception 
The War That Saved My Life received critical acclaim. The Horn Book Magazine claims "This is a feel-good story, but an earned one". School Library Journal talks about the emotional connection readers will have: "Readers will ache for her as she misreads cues and pushes Susan away, even though she yearns to be enfolded in a hug. There is much to like here-Ada's engaging voice, the vivid setting, the humor, the heartbreak, but most of all the tenacious will to survive exhibited by Ada and the villagers who grow to love and accept her". Thom Barthelmess in The Horn Book Magazine stated "Bradley’s novel is exceptional for the characters’ deep humanity".

References 

2015 American novels
2015 children's books
Newbery Honor-winning works
Mark Twain Awards
Children's historical novels
American historical fiction
American children's novels
Dial Press books
Novels set during World War II
English-language novels
Novels set in London
Novels set in the 1940s